Tremont Township is one of twelve townships in Buchanan County, Missouri, USA.  As of the 2010 census, its population was 649.

Tremont Township was established in 1839.

Geography
It contains two cemeteries: Bretz and New Harmony.

The stream of Riley Branch runs through this township.

References

External links
 US-Counties.com
 City-Data.com
 USGS Geographic Names Information System (GNIS)

Townships in Buchanan County, Missouri
Townships in Missouri